Ngọc Châu may refer to several places in Vietnam, including:

Ngọc Châu, Hải Dương, a ward of Hải Dương
Ngọc Châu, Bắc Giang, a commune of Tân Yên District